Magnetar Capital is a hedge fund based in Evanston, Illinois. The firm was founded in 2005 and invests in fixed income, energy, quantitative and event-driven strategies. The firm was actively involved in the collateralized debt obligation (CDO) market during the 2006–2007 period. In some articles critical of Magnetar Capital, the firm's arbitrage strategy for CDOs is described as the "Magnetar trade".

The company has additional offices in New York City, London, England, Houston, Texas, and Minneapolis, Minnesota.

In 2006–2007, Magnetar Capital "facilitated the creation of a few of the worst-performing collateralized debt obligations", many named after stars or constellations. While the CDOs Magnetar Capital helped create led to losses on Wall Street, the company profited as a result of its hedged investment strategy; Magnetar Capital had protected itself against losses on CDOs by purchasing credit default swaps. As of 2010, 23 of the CDOs Magnetar Capital invested in had become "nearly worthless". Despite investigations by the U.S. Securities and Exchange Commission into several deals in which Magnetar Capital invested, there was no enforcement action filed against the firm.

History    
Magnetar Capital was founded in 2005 by Alec Litowitz (formerly of Citadel LLC) and Ross Laser (formerly of Glenwood Capital Partners). Based in Evanston, Illinois, the firm started with $1.8 billion in capital, making it one of the largest hedge fund launches at the time. Early on, Magnetar Capital's multi-strategy fund invested in event-driven investments and the firm doubled in size to nearly $4 billion by the end of 2006. The firm launched into other areas, among them private investments in public equity, reinsurance, and traditional asset management, but turned its focus to fixed income. In 2005, Magnetar began investing in the North American energy sector.

2006–2007 involvement with CDOs 
Magnetar Capital was actively involved in the collateralized debt obligation markets during the 2006–2007 period, when it invested in the equity of about $30 billion worth of CDOs. As a proposed means to hedge CDO investments, Goldman Sachs sent Magnetar Capital marketing information regarding "short bets" against the housing market via an asset-backed securities index (ABX). Partner David Snyderman told Derivatives Week at the time that Magnetar Capital was "excited about the opportunities in the mortgage derivatives market". 

CDO investments are divided into risk-based tranches: the highest risk slices offer the highest yield, whereas the safer pieces have lower yields. With what some observers have referred to as the "Magnetar Trade", Magnetar Capital took long positions in the highest risk slices of synthetic collateralized debt obligations and hedged those positions by placing short bets on safer slices called mezzanine tranches via credit default swaps, which act similarly to an insurance policy. This allowed Magnetar Capital to receive payments while the housing market ran smoothly and hedged its downside risk. As a result, it lost money on the riskiest slices it bought, but made much more from the hedges when the market collapsed in 2007. According to mortgage analysts, Magnetar Capital would have benefitted from its Magnetar Trade regardless of whether the subprime market collapsed.    

ProPublicas coverage of the CDO industry, which won the Pulitzer Prize in 2011, made a number of allegations regarding Magnetar Capital's CDO investments, including that Magnetar Capital's trades in the CDO market helped worsen the financial crisis by helping to structure CDOs the company was planning to short (bet against). Other claims made by the ProPublica series include: Magnetar Capital tried to influence CDO managers to buy riskier bonds to increase the likelihood of those CDOs failing; CDOs that Magnetar Capital invested in "defaulted" at a much higher rate than similar CDOs; and the CDO market would have "cooled off" in late 2005 had Magnetar Capital not entered the market, resulting in a less severe financial crisis. ProPublica did note that in its view, while Magnetar Capital's CDOs might have prolonged and exacerbated the financial crisis, the firm did not cause the crisis or the housing bubble.

Janet Tavakoli, a financial industry consultant, wrote in her 2008 book, "Structured Finance and Collateralized Debt Obligations", that Magnetar Capital's Constellation CDOs "seemed designed to fail".

Contrary to the allegations, Magnetar Capital maintains that it did not control asset selection for the CDOs in which it invested and that the firm did not place an overall bet against the housing market.  The firm said its investments were market neutral and would have made money whether the housing market went up or down. According to the Financial Times, "Magnetar argues that it was not shorting the subprime market but was arbitraging between different layers of CDOs, taking advantage of the fact that it could get a yield of 20 per cent on the equity and then hedge that by shorting the mezzanine layers".

2010 lawsuits 
In 2010, the Securities and Exchange Commission filed a complaint against JP Morgan Chase for a deal in 2007 that involved securities picked by Magnetar Capital. JP Morgan settled the lawsuit for $153.6 million in 2011. Separately, in 2012, The Wall Street Journal reported that the government sought to see if Magnetar "had such a strong influence in designing any of the deals that in effect it took over the role of collateral manager". Particularly, the regulator spent more than a year examining whether Magnetar Capital had any influence over asset selection of a $1.5 billion CDO created by Merrill Lynch called Norma CDO I, but the SEC took no action against the firm.

In 2010, Intesa Sanpaolo named Magnetar Capital, and others, in its lawsuit against Credit Agricole, alleging fraud related to the CDO Pyxis ABS CDO 2006-1. The suit alleged that a Credit Agricole unit concealed Magnetar's role in the collateralized debt obligation. The case was dismissed, as the court ruled Intesa failed to file the suit in a timely manner.

Parody Prize 
In 2010, Magnetar Capital’s directors, among others, won the Ig Nobel Prize in Economics for "creating and promoting new ways to invest money—ways that maximize financial gain and minimize financial risk for the world economy, or for a portion thereof".

Diversification into other asset classes 
Following the financial crisis, the firm pivoted into quantitative trading and exploring new investments, including films, commercial jets, and real estate.  In January 2013, the firm became the largest homeowner in Huber Heights, Ohio, by buying a portfolio of almost 2,000 rental homes from the family of the town's original developer. It rents these homes as part of its investment strategy. Magnetar Capital also invests in European real estate. 

The firm entered the film financing business in 2013, when it provided most of the funding for a $400 million co-financing deal that provided 20th Century Fox with money to fund a slate of films over a five-year period.

In 2014, Magnetar Capital introduced two new energy funds, Magnetar Solar Holdings and Magnetar Solar Opportunities Fund. Magnetar Solar (UK) owned 25 solar farms with approximately 300 megawatts of generation capacity. In 2016, Magnetar Capital owned about 344 megawatts of the UK's solar production. The firm sold its UK solar portfolio to Rockfire Capital in 2018.

Mergers and acquisitions 

The New York City-based Blackstone Group's hedge fund unit, Blackstone Alternative Asset Management, through its Strategic Capital Holdings Fund, bought a minority stake of Magnetar in 2015. Financials of the deal were not disclosed; Magnetar said the deal would help it expand, and management remained in place following the deal. 

Magnetar Capital bought a majority stake in auto lender First Citizen, of Dublin, Ireland, in 2017. 

As of 2018, energy continues to be an investment interest of the company, including a stake in Double Eagle Energy Holdings III Permian in Texas.

See also
 List of CDO managers
 Goldman Sachs: Abacus mortgage-backed CDOs
 Merrill Lynch: CDO controversies
 Subprime mortgage crisis

References

Financial services companies established in 2005
Hedge fund firms of the United States
Companies based in Evanston, Illinois